Nicrophorus smefarka is a burying beetle described by Jirí Háva, J. Schneider & Jan Růžička in 1999.

References

Silphidae
Beetles of North America
Beetles described in 1999